The Deep River Boys were an American gospel music group active from the mid-1930s and into the 1980s. The group performed spirituals, gospel, and R&B.

Members
The original group consisted of Harry Douglass (baritone), Vernon Gardner (first tenor), George Lawson (second tenor) and Edward Ware (bass). George Lawson was replaced by Willie James (Jimmy) Lundy in 1950, who became first tenor, with Vernon Gardner switching to second tenor. Other personnel changes took place during the group's long history, although Douglass remained as a constant throughout.

Musical career
The group began at Hampton Institute, now known as Hampton University in Hampton, Virginia. Initial success came about through their winning a talent competition on the radio which, in turn, led to further radio and stage appearances. During World War II, they toured extensively for the USO entertaining US troops abroad. In 1952, their song "Recess in Heaven" became their first hit. They also toured with Bill "Bojangles" Robinson.

In 1950, they left for Canada where they had a long engagement in Montreal. Upon return, they appeared on TV on The Ed Sullivan Show and The Milton Berle Show.  They then left for another long engagement in Philadelphia. Early that year, they recorded "Solid as a Rock" with the Count Basie Orchestra. In July, they also recorded a version of "Tuxedo Junction" with the Erskine Hawkins, the composer of the tune. Then, they left for England where they embarked upon a 10-week engagement at the London Palladium. Whilst there they received a citation naming them as the "Most popular entertainers of American troops in England".

Despite their success in England and in Canada, their records were not selling well in the US so left their former record company RCA and signed for the smaller company Beacon Records. But, even with the promotional efforts of Joe Davis, the owner of Beacon, their record sales are still disappointing so they re-signed with RCA. Surprisingly in 1954, they are back with Beacon. They also performed with Count Basie, Fats Waller, Charlie Christian and Thelma Carpenter.

In Europe, they were especially popular in countries such as Sweden and Norway from the 1950s and upwards, appearing on numerous TV shows, even releasing several hit-singles performing songs in Swedish and Norwegian. In the winter of 1956, they were photographed by The Newcastle Journal with Rev. Eric L. Robinson, then minister of Central Methodist Church, Newcastle-on-Tyne, England.  They returned at least once more in October 1958  and participated in a special noon-time church service, introducing Northumbrians to American gospel music. As late as the 1970s, they recorded a Norwegian-language version of the Norwegian hit song "Ratiti". The group continued to tour into the early 1980s.

The last surviving early member of the group, Jimmy Lundy, lived in Portsmouth, Virginia and died in October 2007, in Maryview Hospital in Portsmouth, Virginia. Two later members of the group are still alive: Ronnie Bright was the bass of the Deep River Boys from 1964 until 1968. After leaving the group he went to the Coasters, from which he has now retired. Eddie Whaley Jr (the son of Eddie Whaley of the comedy duo Scott and Whaley) was tenor of the Deeps from 1969 until 1971. He was born in Brighton, England, but now lives in Florida.

Awards and honors
In 2019, their 1941 single "They Look Like Men of War" was selected by the Library of Congress for preservation in the National Recording Registry for being "culturally, historically, or aesthetically significant".

References

External links

20th-century African-American male singers
American folk musical groups
American Christian musical groups
American gospel musical groups
Musical groups established in the 1930s